3 Piece Suite is an Australian pop band mad up of singers Clive Suares, and brothers Dwane and Terri Lee. They released their debut single in May 2002, a cover of Del Shannon's Runaway. It debuted at number 60 on the ARIA Single chart, rising to 54.

Discography
singles
"Runaway" (2002) - MGM Aus #54

References

Australian pop music groups